Dione (following its French spelling in Senegal) is a typical Serer surname. In English speaking Gambia (where the Serers are also present), it is spelled Jon. 

Notable people with this name include:
Maysa Waaly Dione (king of Sine from 1350–1370)

References

Serer surnames